John R Chapin (1827-1907) was a 19th-century American artist and illustrator, who worked for Harper's Magazine. He was especially noted for a series of illustrations entitled Artist life in the highlands of New Jersey published in April 1860 which gave a realistic depiction  of the daily life of miners.

External links

 "Artist life in the highlands of New Jersey"

American illustrators
1827 births
1907 deaths